Taillet is a commune in the Pyrénées-Orientales department in southern France.

 the population was 105.

Geography 
Taillet is located in the canton of Le Canigou and in the arrondissement of Céret.

The town is at the foot of the eastern end of the Pyrenees mountains, close to the border with the eastern tip of Spain, near the Mediterranean Sea. It mostly has lush forestland, some grazing land for animals and croplands.

Population

See also
Communes of the Pyrénées-Orientales department

References

External links

Communes of Pyrénées-Orientales